Revolution Come...Revolution Go is the eleventh studio album by Southern rock jam band Gov't Mule, released on June 9, 2017.

Track listing

Personnel

Gov't Mule
 Warren Haynes – vocals, guitar
 Matt Abts – drums, percussion
 Danny Louis – keyboards, rhythm guitar, horns, backing vocals
 Jorgen Carlsson – bass

Additional personnel
 Gordie Johnson – steel guitar on "Traveling Tune"
 Rey Arteaga – percussion
 Sheree Smith – backing vocals
 Angela Miller – backing vocals
 Lauren Cervantez – backing vocals
 Alecia Chakour – backing vocals
 Jasmine Muhammad – backing vocals
 Bobby Allende – congas
 Jimmie Vaughan – guitar on "Burning Point"

Charts

References

2017 albums
Gov't Mule albums